Shrimant Maharaja Sir Khanderao II Gaekwad, Sena Khas Khel Shamsher Bahadur, GCSI  (1828–1870) was the Maharaja of Baroda State from 1856 to 1870.

Early life 
He was born in 1828.

Reign 
He was the third son of Maharaja Sayaji Rao Gaekwad II. He succeeded to the throne on the death of his eldest brother and the king Ganpat Rao Gaekwad on 19 November 1856 and reigned till his death on 28 November 1870. He was knighted  as GCSI in 1861.

He commissioned the Pearl Carpet of Baroda, which he intended to donate to Prophet Muhammad's Tomb in Medina, however he died before the donation could take place.

He died suddenly in 1870 and was succeeded by his brother Malharrao Gaekwad but Malharrao was later deposed by British and widow of Kanderao II, Maharani Jamnabai Sahib Gaekwad, later adopted a boy from the related family, who became the next ruler of Baroda State - Sayajirao Gaekwad III.

During his reign, the Baroda State started the narrow gauge railway, known as Gaekwar's Baroda State Railway. It was started in the year 1862.

Religious views 
Although a Hindu himself, the Maharaja supposedly had an admiration of Islam, and that was the reason for his desire to gift the pearl carpet to Prophet Muhammad's tomb.

References

Notes

Citations

Further reading 

 L'Inde des Rajahs: Voyage Dans l'Inde Centrale (1875) - Viaje a la India de los Maharajas - Espasa Calpe 1954 Pags 23-54

1828 births
1870 deaths
Knights Grand Commander of the Order of the Star of India
Maharajas of Vadodara
People of the Maratha Empire
Indian knights